, also known as Shin Chan Let's Dance Amigo!, is a 2006 anime film. It is the 14th film based on the popular comedy manga and anime series Crayon Shin-chan. The film was released to theatres on April 15, 2006 in Japan.

The film was produced by Shin-Ei Animation, the studio behind the anime television.

Plot 
Futaba kindergarten will be having their carnival soon. Instead of traditional Kasukabe dance, Miss Matsuzaka suggested that they have Samba dance for this year, but Miss Yoshinaga and Miss Ageo went against her suggestion. Anyhow, Miss Yoshinaga changed her attitude on the second day and even suggested Samba dance to the principal. On the other hand, Bo-chan told everyone about a rumor that clones are found in Kasukabe. The same rumor is heard by Shin-chan’s mom as well. While everyone doesn’t take it seriously, the clones of Nohara family members are coming out one by one. Whose conspiracy behind this phenomenon? What is the purpose of having these clones?

An urban legend that imposters are pretending to be living as the real people, spreads through Kasukabe-city where the Nohara family lives. The family encounters their imposters on a shopping trip. Jackie from an International Secret Organization, SRI, narrowly wards off the imposters, but the city is now filled with imposters. The family attempts to escape the city with Jackie, but is caught in an enemy base. At the base, imposters are mass produced, using the "Konjaclone" technology developed by an authority of biotechnology, Amigo Suzuki. The samba duel between Amigo Suzuki and Jackie commences. Jackie cannot dance to her satisfaction, and Shinnosuke encourages her to "dance as she likes" by showing his dance with his back side exposed. Jackie gains momentum and defeats Amigo Suzuki. Peace returns to Kasukabe city after that it is revealed that Suzuki is Jackie' s father.

Cultural references

"SRI" organization to appear in the drama, drama "special effects were produced in 1968 Kaiki Daisakusen, including a parody of a fictitious organization ", that appeared in Tsuburaya some work. Here, the abbreviation of (Science Research Institute) Institute of Scientific Investigation, however. The name of "Jacqueline Feeney" is this work Jack Finii shows that inspired "(The Body Snatchers) town was stolen" novel.

Colt Government 
Jackie's semi-automatic pistol.

H & K MP5
With members of SRI. Is to replace the magazine, can also be used as a light machine gun is also normal for the dissolution as a special water gun konnyaku loan.

UZI
Chico's light machine gun.

Two types Volkswagen Microbus T1
Jackie has been used for the investigation retro in a car, furniture of SRI. Appearance is no different from commercial vehicles, the interior has been converted into a special vehicle, computer and sensors are installed and a large number. Desktop of the computer used to send and receive mail and browse the database GUI is Mac OS X has become a thing of. In addition, the center of the front Volkswagen mark has been changed to the logo of the SRI.

Konnyaku loan (or Konnya clone)Biotechnology has a clone is produced by Amigo Suzuki. Ordinary konjac will move themselves while raising the queer voice cut into the human type, and immersed in a liquid of a mystery to it, it special miso and crush with a press machine, to be exactly like a particular person.
There is a difference, such as "begin to psychedelic dance, but look indistinguishable from the real thing at all, and listen to music" "become a good personality, unlike real bright seaweed." Such as blow given the damage is not exactly a very soft body tissue, the body is bent in the direction they eat a blow too strong and strange. 
They melted the instantaneous explode like fireworks into the air and is pulled up out the "Kodama ass", and be subjected to a special liquid. Dance and konnyaku loan, dance force to be also the way that was the source person. In the secret base of Amigo Suzuki everyone was kidnapped person has been danced."Transformation Plans for Samba World"At the beginning, Amigo Suzuki put a samba carnival into practice as the integrity of "Transformation Plans for Samba World" in the city of Santa Monaka, California. The plan was based on six cities of the world and was going to be extended world wide. The city of Kasukabe in Japan was chosen to the sixth base of "Transformation Plans for Samba World" by Amigo Suzuki.Amigo SuzukiThe fanatic believer of psychedelic samba dance. He seems to live in California and was the ringleader of mysterious project "Transformation Plans for Samba World".Jackie'''
A daughter of Amigo Suzuki. But she disliked her father and accused him. She takes sides with Crayon Shin-chan and Kasukabe defense corps that is going to prevent fanatic and stupid "Transformation Plans for Samba World".

See also
 Crayon Shin-chan
 Yoshito Usui

References

External links
 
 
 Shin-chan: The Legend Called: Dance! Amigo! Official Trailer

2006 anime films
Legend Called: Dance! Amigo!
Toho animated films